Electoral results for the district of Croydon may refer to:

 Electoral results for the district of Croydon (South Australia), electoral results for the district of the South Australian House of Assembly
 Electoral results for the district of Croydon (Victoria), electoral results for the district of the Victorian Legislative Assembly
 Electoral results for the district of Croydon (New South Wales), electoral results for the former district of the New South Wales Legislative Assembly
 Electoral results for the district of Croydon (Queensland), electoral results for the former district of the Queensland Legislative Assembly